Rocky Mattioli (born Rocco Mattioli, 20 September 1953) an Italian-born Australian former boxer at junior middleweight, and former world champion.

Rocky was the 2004 Inductee for the Australian National Boxing Hall of Fame Moderns category.

Career
Mattioli was born in Ripa Teatina, near Chieti, in Abruzzo in central Italy. He emigrated to Australia with his family at the age of six and lived in Morwell, Victoria.

He turned professional in 1970 and started training with Italian trainer Arnold Rossi. In 1977, he captured the WBC Light Middleweight Title with a KO over Eckhard Dagge. He defended the title twice before losing it to Maurice Hope in 1979 by TKO. In 1980, he had a rematch with Hope, but again was TKO'd, in the 11th round. He retired in 1982, settling in Milan.

Professional boxing record

See also
List of world light-middleweight boxing champions

References

External links

 

1953 births
Living people
Italian male boxers
Sportspeople from the Province of Chieti
Italian emigrants to Australia
Australian male boxers
Light-middleweight boxers
World light-middleweight boxing champions
World Boxing Council champions